StandArt is the tenth studio album by Tigran Hamasyan. It was released by Nonesuch Records on 29 April 2022. It is Hamasyan's first covers album, and features eight jazz standards and one original composition.

Critical Reception 

The Times wrote; "Standards are those tunes mostly borrowed from the Great American Songbook whose harmonic richness and rhythmic flexibility make them ideal for improvising. No matter how fashions in jazz change, they remain popular, yet Tigran Hamasyan certainly tests their durability on this intriguing, challenging album." PopMatters wrote; "The production is clean and loud, and Hamasyan’s dynamic playing sometimes sends notes aggressively to the center of the mix. This is jazz for people who like to sit at the edge of their seats." Jazzwise wrote; "It’s perhaps the most integrated example of his highly original personal language that’s evolved through a high level, action-packed career over the past decade."

Track listing

Personnel 

 Tigran Hamasyan - piano
 Matt Brewer - bass 
 Justin Brown - drums
 Mark Turner - saxophone (track 3)
 Joshua Redman - saxophone (track 4)
 Ambrose Akinmusire - trumpet (tracks 7, 8)

References 

Tigran Hamasyan albums
2022 albums
Nonesuch Records albums